Utricularia graminifolia is a small perennial carnivorous plant that belongs to the genus Utricularia. It is native to Asia, where it can be found in Burma, China, India, Sri Lanka, and Thailand. It was originally described and published by Martin Vahl in 1804. It has also recently been grown in planted aquaria. It is however not a true aquatic species, as seen in species from Utricularia subg. Utricularia.

See also 
 List of Utricularia species

References 

Carnivorous plants of Asia
Flora of Myanmar
Flora of China
Flora of India (region)
Flora of Sri Lanka
Flora of Thailand
graminifolia
Taxa named by Martin Vahl